Zbigniew Kupcewicz (born 30 April 1952) was a Polish footballer who played as a forward.

Biography

Kupcewicz started playing football with Gwardia Olsztyn. He then played for Stal Rzeszów before joining I liga team Pogoń Szczecin. While with Pogoń he made 4 appearances in the league over the 1969–70 season. Kupcewicz then moved to the Tricity joining Lechia Gdańsk, making his debut on 28 March 1971 against Gwardia Koszalin. In total for Lechia Kupcewicz played in 20 games and scored 4 goals. After his time with Lechia, Kupcewicz joined Lechia's rivals Arka Gdynia. While at Arka he is noted as having scored the clubs first ever goal in the I liga, Poland's top division. After his first goal against ŁKS Łódź, he is known to have scored another 6 top flight goals for Arka.

Kupcewicz's father, Aleksander Kupcewicz, and his brother, Janusz Kupcewicz, were also both former footballers.

References

1952 births
Stal Rzeszów players
Pogoń Szczecin players
Lechia Gdańsk players
Arka Gdynia players
Polish footballers
Association football forwards
Sportspeople from Gdańsk
Sportspeople from Pomeranian Voivodeship
Living people